The women's 100 metres hurdles event at the 1995 Pan American Games was held at the Estadio Atletico "Justo Roman" on 19 and 21 March.

Medalists

Results

Heats
Wind:Heat 1: -1.6 m/s, Heat 2: -0.8 m/s

Final
Wind: +2.1 m/s

References

Athletics at the 1995 Pan American Games
1995
Pan